The Wisconsin tornado outbreak of 2005 was an outbreak of tornadoes that occurred primarily in southern Wisconsin on August 18, 2005.  A system of storms unleashed a total of 28 tornadoes, 27 of which were confirmed in southern Wisconsin, and 1 confirmed in Minnesota. This outbreak set a new record for the most tornadoes observed in the state in a single day, breaking the previous record of 24 tornadoes set on May 8, 1988. The system generating the Stoughton tornado was also accompanied by many reports of severe winds and hail throughout the region. The Stoughton tornado was documented on an episode of The Weather Channel's Storm Stories.

Tornadoes

August 18 event

Stoughton, Wisconsin

By far the most significant tornado of the day developed 2.0 miles (3.2 km) north of Oregon at 6:15 p.m.. This large, intense multiple-vortex tornado tracked 20.0 miles (32.2 km) into Jefferson County from Dane County, devastating the town of Stoughton.

East of Oregon the tornado tore through several farms before impacting residential subdivisions in Stoughton. One person was crushed to death in their basement from fireplace and chimney bricks that crashed through the floor. Numerous homes, businesses, farm buildings, vehicles, power-lines, trees, and other personal effects were either damaged or destroyed along its path that grew to a maximum width of about 600 yards north of Stoughton. As for residential structures, 220 sustained minor damage, 84 had major damage, and 69 were destroyed. As for business structures, 6 sustained minor damage, 1 had major damage, and 1 was destroyed. As for agricultural structures, 5 sustained minor damage, 5 had major damage, and 40 were destroyed. Several vehicles were flipped and tossed as well. Some homes in town were completely leveled, and an F4 rating was considered. Further investigation revealed that the homes were not well-built, and the slow (sometimes nearly stationary) forward movement of the tornado negated a rating higher than F3. After striking Stoughton, the tornado caused damage to trees and crops north of Busseyville before dissipating. Debris from this tornado was lofted by the parent updraft and carried downstream to scattered locations in the counties of Jefferson, Waukesha, Milwaukee, Walworth, Racine, and Kenosha. 23 people were injured.

Ten years later to the day, three tornadoes touched down outside of Lake Geneva, Big Bend, and Waukesha. There were no injuries or fatalities from those tornadoes.

See also
List of North American tornadoes and tornado outbreaks
Tornadoes of 2005
Southern Ontario tornado outbreak of 2005 – An outbreak the following day produced by the same area of low pressure.

References

External links
Stoughton Tornado Website (Jonathon G. Lampe)
National Weather Service Milwaukee report
NWS La Crosse report
Photos from spotter organization MidWest SSTRC. (Dale Bernstein-President, and Dan H.)
Video about The Tornado and Church Fire from Stoughton's Public, educational, and government access cable TV channel

F3 tornadoes
Tornadoes of 2005
Tornadoes in Wisconsin
2005 natural disasters in the United States
2005 in Wisconsin
August 2005 events in the United States